Zöblen is a municipality in the district of Reutte in the Austrian state of Tyrol.

The village of Zoeblen is one of five villages in the Tannheim valley. Zoeblen is mostly a tourist area and offers many activities for guests in winter and summer.

References

Cities and towns in Reutte District